Roger Nelson (May 8, 1932 – July 29, 1996) was an American and Canadian football offensive tackle and guard.  He played in the Canadian Football League for the Edmonton Eskimos from 1954 to 1967 and was a part of two Grey Cup winning teams for the Eskimos.  Nelson played college football at the University of Oklahoma and was drafted in the fourteenth round of the 1954 NFL Draft.

Nelson was inducted into the Canadian Football Hall of Fame in 1986, the Edmonton Eskimo Wall of Honour in 1987, and, as part of the 1954–1956 Edmonton Eskimos football teams, the Alberta Sport Hall of Fame in 2007.

His son, Mark Nelson, played for the Calgary Stampeders and the Saskatchewan Roughriders between 1980 and 1986 and has coached in both college football and the Canadian Football League. His grandson, Kyle Nelson, played tight end for the New Mexico State Aggies college football team and is currently a Long snapper for the San Francisco 49ers.

References

1932 births
1996 deaths
People from Wynnewood, Oklahoma
Players of American football from Oklahoma
American football offensive tackles
American players of Canadian football
Canadian Football Hall of Fame inductees
Canadian football offensive linemen
Edmonton Elks coaches
Edmonton Elks players
Oklahoma Sooners football players